Rudra veena is a large plucked string instrument used in Hindustani music.

Rudra veena may also refer to:

Rudraveena (film), an Indian Telugu language film
 Rudraveena (teleserial), in Tamil language